Clock EP is the second EP released by the British electronic band Simian Mobile Disco. It was released on 10 March 2008 by Wichita Recordings.

History
This EP is the first released by the band that contains new tracks of duets that cannot be found on its first studio album, Attack Decay Sustain Release. Only released in the UK, it is slightly different from the first EP, Simian Mobile Disco EP, as the first and main track is "Clock" and not "Tits & Acid" (from Attack Decay Sustain Release). It contains only new material from the band.

Track listing
All tracks written by J. Shaw and J. Ford.
 "Clock" - 4:20
 "Simple" - 5:58
 "3 Pin Din" - 3:38
 "State of Things" - 5:03

Simian Mobile Disco albums
Albums produced by James Ford (musician)
2007 EPs
Wichita Recordings EPs